Solar Hero is a 2012 Canadian documentary film directed by Matt Keay. The documentary follows Team Alberta (Alberta Solar Decathlon Project) as they journey to in the 2009 US DOE Solar Decathlon Competition in Washington, DC in October 2009.

See also
 Alberta Solar Decathlon Project
 2009 US DOE Solar Decathlon Competition
 Solar energy

References
 Official film website

External links
 
 University of Calgary page
 
 University page
 University page
 Calgary Herald article

Canadian documentary films
Documentary films about alternative energy
2012 documentary films
2012 films
2010s English-language films
2010s Canadian films